The Muana or Mowana village is situated in block Safidon, District Jind of state Haryana. Muana is a very old and historic Khera or village. The village Muana is the Thikana of Madadh Rajputs.

Villages in Jind district